Flower Painter in Ordinary, also called Flower Painter to the Queen, is a position in the United Kingdom awarded to a painter, and connected to the Queen. Holders of the office included:

Joseph Barney, "Fruit and Flower Painter to the Queen", (1753-1832)
Phoebe Earle, (wife of Denis Dighton and sister of Augustus Earle), was "Fruit and Flower Painter to the Queen" to Queen Adelaide
Augusta Innes Withers, to Queen Adelaide and Queen Victoria
Valentine Bartholomew to Queen Victoria (from before 1849 until his death in 1879)
Helen Cordelia Angell to Queen Victoria (1879-1884)

Notes

See also
Principal Painter in Ordinary
Peter Brown, Botanical Painter to the Prince of Wales in the late 18th century

Positions within the British Royal Household
18th-century English painters
19th-century English painters